Jiwan may refer to:

 Jiwan Luitel, Nepali film actor 
 Kim Jiwan, South Korean professional basketball player 
 Hari Jiwan Singh Khalsa, prominent American Sikh
 Bhai Jiwan Singh, Majhabi Sikh General
 Jiwan Singh Umranangal, Indian politician belonging to the Akali Dal
 Raja Sukh Jiwan Mal, king of Kashmir

Other 
 Jiwan Pur
 Mera Jiwan
 Nangal Jiwan
 Jiwan Nangal
 Radio Naya Jiwan
 Jiwan Kada Ki Phool

See also 
 Jivan